The University of Pretoria – Tuks Camerata is one of five choirs that the University of Pretoria, South Africa has on its campus. The other four are The UP OVUWA, The University of Pretoria Youth Choir, The University of Pretoria Jacaranda Children's Choir and the University of Pretoria Concert Choir. It is the official Choir of the University of Pretoria.

Biography
The Camerata was officially established on 20 March 1968. Its mission is to make a contribution towards the cultural development of the student corps and the cultural enrichment of the community through choral singing. The choir also endeavours to promote a worthy image of the University of Pretoria through striving towards the highest possible artistic standards together with a code of conduct that meets the highest requirements of companionship.

Camerata is generally a small choir with between 40 and 60 voices. The exact number differs between choir years.
The choir operates under the auspices of the Department of Music of the University of Pretoria. The conductors have always aimed for high artistic values. The choir has previously been conducted by:
 Adolf Theron
 Willem van Tonder
 Petru Grabe
 Prof. Johann van der Sandt January 1999 – June 2008
 Richter Grimbeek From August 2008 (ad interim)
 Christo Burger From January 2009
 Michael Joseph Barrett From April 2013

Highlights and achievements
 1989 and 1993 – Roodepoort International Eisteddfod of South Africa, First Prize for Mixed Choirs
 1994 – Tallinn Choir Festival (Estonia), First Prize for Mixed Choirs
 1996 – Fourth International Symposium on Choral Music, Sydney (Australia), Guest Choir
 1999 – International Choral Competition for Advent and Christmas Music, Prague (Czech Republic), Category Winners and Overall winner of the competition
 2001 – SNK International Choral Competition Arnhem (Netherlands), Second Prize for Mixed Choirs
 2001 – Singkreis Porcia International Choral Competition, Spittal an der Drau (Austria), Winner
 2002 – 6th World Choral Symposium, Minneapolis, Minnesota (United States), Guest Choir
 2004 – Concert Tour to the United States
 2006 – Concert Tour to Kenya and Tanzania
 2007 – Competition Tour to Italy and concert tour to Austria, first prize in the Jazz and Pop category at the 46th CA Seghizzi International Choral Competition, Gorizia.

Repertoire
The choirs larger scope works include: Misa Criolla (Ramirez), Messiah (Handel), Weihnachtsoratorium (Bach), Missa aulica (Mozart), Mass in E minor (Bruckner), Requiem (Fauré), Requiem (Mozart), Ein deutsches Requiem (Brahms), Elijah (Mendelssohn), Magnificat (Bach), A Carol Cantata (Hendrik Hofmeyr), Carmina Burana (Orff)

2007

The repertoire for 2007 includes:
 Ag, As Ek Maar Net Vlerke Soos 'n Duif Kon Gehad Het ~ Niel van der Watt (*1962–)
 Ave, Maris Stella ~ Edvard Grieg (1843–1907)
 Bohemian Rhapsody ~ Queen
 Come Again, Sweet Days ~ John Dowland (1697)
 Hear my prayer, O Lord ~ Henry Purcell (1659–1695)/Sven-David Sandström (*1928–)
 De Profundis ~ Giuseppe Cappotto
 Geburten ~ Andrea Venturini
 Cloudburst ~ Eric Whitacre (*1970–) – Text by Octavio Paz
 Her Sacred Spirit Soars ~ Eric Whitacre (*1970–)
 Hymne (Dein Sind in Die Himmel) ~ Josef Rheinberger (1839–1901)
 Java Jive ~ Ben Oakland arranged by Kirby Shaw
 Jezus Es Kufarok ~ Zoltán Kodály
 Jesus Se Oprag En Seen ~ Chris Lamprecht
 Kyrie from Mass in E-Flat Major ~ Josef Rheinberger (1839–1901)
 Mitä kaikatat, kivonen ~ Mia Makaroff (*1971–)
 Psalm 23 ~ Chris Lamprecht
 Roads ~ Steve Dobrogosz
 Singet Dem Herrn Ein Neues Lied ~ Felix Mendelssohn (1809–1847)
 Singet Dem Herrn Ein Neues Lied ~ Hugo Distler
 Regn Og Rusk Og Rosenbusk ~ Bo Holten
 Axuri Beltza ~ Arranged: Javier Busto
 Biegga Luohte ~ Jan Sandström
 Die Dans van die Reën ~ Hendrik Hofmeyr
 Drive My Car ~ The Beatles
 Hymne à la Vierge	~ Pierre Villette
 Përkonami Melni Zirgi ~ V. Šmidbergs
 Psalm 139 ~ Sven-David Sandström
 Repleti Sunt Omnes ~ Martin Watt
 There Will be Rest ~ Frank Ticheli
 Ubi Caritas et Amor ~ Morten Lauridsen
 Zure Boza	Xabier Sarasola
 EXTENDED WORK: Duke Ellington's Sacred Concert ~ Duke Ellington

2009

The repertoire for 2009 consists of:

In Remembrance (From Requiem) ~ Eleanor Joanne Daley
Agnus Dei ~ Frank Martin
Audi, et ego loquar ~ Niel van der Watt
Daemon Irrepit Callidus ~ György Orbán
Sing Joyfully ~ William Byrd
Gloria ~ Ralph Hoffman
A Jubilant Song ~ René Clausen
Cover me with the Night ~ Peter Katzow
Gamelan ~ R. Murray Schafer
He Never Failed Me Yet ~ Traditional African-American Spiritual
Voices of Autumn ~ Jackson Hill

2010

The repertoire of 2010 includes:

Ave Maris Stella ~ Javier Busto
Bin-Nam-Ma (Lluvia Larga – Edless Rain) ~ Alberto Grau
Dies Irae
Ecco ~ Pieter Bezuidenhout
The Elegy of Anne Boleyn ~ Jeffrey Biegel
Ich bin ein rechter Weinstock ~ Heinrich Schutz
Neišeik, Saulala ~ Vytautas Miškinis
Salve Regina ~ David N. Childs
Verleih uns Frieden ~ Felix Mendelssohn
Voices of Autumn ~ Jackson Hill

2013

The repertoire for 2013 includes:
Indodana Rolf Schmitt
Gloria Ralph Hoffman
In der passionzeit Felix Mendelssohn
Sure on the shining night Morten Lauridsen
I'm gonna sing til the spirit moves in my heart Moses Hogan
O Crux ave Rihards Dubra
Open Thou Mine Eyes John Rutter
The Majesty and Glory of Your Name Thomas Fettke
Ar laiku puķes vīst Peteris Vasks
Things that never die Elanor Daley
Traditional African Music

Membership
Membership of the choir is open to all registered students of the University of Pretoria younger than 30 years. Candidates need to successfully pass an audition to be accepted into the choir. The choir auditions for the year 2009 differed from the traditional Camerata auditions mainly because of the new conductor (Christo Burger). Candidates simply had to sing a traditional folklore song and after that do vocal tests. The auditions were held from 28 January to 5 March 2009. After that the 2009 choir was announced, and rehearsals began.

From 2010 onwards the auditions are held as usual: a candidate must pass a standard audition, as well as "Know-your-music" audition, where he/she sings excerpts from the repertoire for the year to show the conductor that he/she knows the music.

Cultural development
The choir regards it as its duty to play a formative role in the cultural-spiritual endowment of its members within the milieu of discipline and commitment. Amidst the great need for expertise in choral conducting, the Tuks Camerata endeavours to be a training ground for future choir conductors.

The conductor
With Johann van der Sandt's departure in June 2008, the Camerata employed Christo Burger as official new conductor. The Camerata appointed Michael Joseph Barrett as the official conductor as of 1 April 2013.

Recordings
The choir has released a number of CDs in conjunction with the Singkronies Chamber Choir, The University of Pretoria Chorale and Can't'Afrika.

The most recent CDs are:
 An international Collection of Choral Music – The Tuks Camerata (2006)
 Khutso – Chant for Peace – Singkronies Chamber Choir, The University of Pretoria Chorale and Can't'Afrika (2006)
 Voices of Autumn – University of Pretoria Camerata (2012) 
 Phoenix – The University of Pretoria Camerata (2014)
 Love and War – The University of Pretoria Camerata (2016)
 Indodana – The University of Pretoria Camerata (2017)

References

External links
 Tuks Camerata Official Site 
 The University of Pretoria Camerata
 46th International Competition of Choral Music
 Singkronies Chamber Choir
 The East Rand Youth Choir

Culture of the City of Tshwane
South African choirs
Pretoria Camerata
Camerata
Musical groups established in 1968